The Orto Botanico Locatelli (300 m2) is a small botanical garden located in the northeastern corner of the Parco della Bissuola (Parco Albanese), Mestre, Veneto, Italy. It is open Sunday evenings from May to October

The garden aims to integrate botany, ecology, and philosophy. It contains about 250 species organized into the following sections: medicinal plants (about 60 species), trees and shrubs of the Venetian landscape, vegetables and fruits, and a small collection of ornamental plants. It also contains a small covered area, about forty seats, which serves as a site for lectures and short courses on botanical subjects.

See also 
 List of botanical gardens in Italy

References 
 Orto Botanico Locatelli
 Destination360 tourism article
  Il Valore delle Piante e La Cultura del Bosco, published by the Orto Botanico Locatelli
  EstOvest article
  Parco Alfredo Albanese
  Piccola guida per i bambini di Mestre

Botanical gardens in Italy
Buildings and structures in Venice
Gardens in Veneto